Nangarhār also called Nangrahar or Ningrahar, is one of the 34 provinces of Afghanistan, located in the eastern part of the country and bordering Logar, Kabul, Laghman and Kunar provinces as well as having an international border with Pakistan. It is divided into 22 districts and has a population of about 1,735,531, the third highest of the country's 34 provinces. The city of Jalalabad is the capital of Nangarhar province. Nangarhar province is famous for fish and karaye, and the popular tourist locations Daroonta and Pul-e- Sayad.

Etymology
Henry George Raverty theorized that the word Nangarhar is derived from the Pashto term nang-nahlr ("nine streams"), which appears in some Persian chronicles. The term supposedly refers to nine streams originating from Safed Koh. However, according to S. H. Hodivala, the name of the province derives from the Sanskrit term Nagarahara, which appears in a 9th-century inscription discovered at Ghosrawa in present-day Bihar, India. Nà-jiā-luó-ā, the Chinese transcription of Nagarahara, appears in the annals of the Song dynasty of China. Henry Walter Bellew derived the name from the Sanskrit nava-vihara, meaning "nine viharas".

History

Early history

The province was originally part of the Achaemenid Empire, in the Gandhara satrapy (province). The people in the area were originally Hindus and Buddhists. The Nangarhar province territory and the Eastern Iranian peoples there fell to the Maurya Empire, which was led by Chandragupta Maurya. Seleucus is said to have reached a peace treaty with Chandragupta by giving control of the territory south of the Hindu Kush to the Mauryas upon intermarriage and 500 elephants.

Song Yun, a Chinese monk visited Nangarhar in 520 AD, claimed that the people in the area were Buddhists. Yun came across a vihara (monastery) in Nangarhar (Na-lka-lo-hu) containing the skull of Buddha, and another of Kekalam (probably Mihtarlam in Laghman province) where 13 pieces of the cloak of Buddha and his 18 feet long mast were preserved. In the city of Naki, a tooth and hair of Buddha were preserved and in the Kupala cave Buddha's shadow reflected close to which he saw a stone tablet which was at that time considered to be related to Buddha (probably the stone tablet of Ashoka in Darūntah).

The region fell to the Ghaznavids after defeating Jayapala in the late 10th century. It later fell to the Ghorids followed by the Khaljis, Lodhis and the Moghuals, until finally becoming part of Ahmad Shah Durrani's Afghan Empire in 1747.

During the First Anglo-Afghan War, the invading British-led Indian forces were defeated on their way to Rawalpindi in 1842. British-led Indian forces returned in 1878 but retreated a couple of years later. Some fighting took place during the 1919 Third Anglo-Afghan War between the Afghan army that were led by King Amanullah Khan and British-Indians near the Durand Line border areas.

The province remained relatively calm until the 1980s Soviet–Afghan War. Nangarhar was used by pro-Pakistani mujahideen (rebel forces) fighting against the Soviet-backed Democratic Republic of Afghanistan. The Pakistani-trained mujahideen received funding from the United States and Saudi Arabia. Many Arab fighters from the Arab World had been fighting against the government forces of Mohammad Najibullah, who ultimately defeated them near Jalalabad. In April 1992, Najibullah resigned as President and the various mujahideen took control over the country. When the 1992 Peshawar Accord failed, the mujahideen turned guns on each other and started a nationwide civil war. This was followed by the Taliban take-over in 1996 and the establishment of al-Qaeda training camps in Nangarhar province.

Recent history

Osama bin Laden held a strong position in Nangarhar during the late 1990s. He led a fight against US-led forces in the 2001 Tora Bora campaign. He ultimately escaped to Abottabad, Pakistan, where he was killed in a night raid by members of SEAL Team Six in 2011.

After the removal of the Taliban government and the formation of the Karzai administration in late 2001, U.S.-led Afghan National Security Forces (ANSF) gradually established authority across the province. Despite this, Taliban insurgents continue to stage attacks against Afghan government forces. The Haqqani Network and militants loyal to Islamic State of Iraq and the Levant – Khorasan Province (ISIL-KP) are often blamed for the attacks, which sometimes include major suicide bombings. Several incursions by Pakistani military forces have also been reported in the districts next to the Durand Line border. The focus of the conflict is on the Kabul and Kunar rivers, which run through Nangarhar.

On April 13, 2017, U.S. President Donald Trump ordered a targeted strike on ISIL-KP by use of the second largest non-nuclear bomb in the U.S. arsenal at the time. The bomb was a 21,000 lb. weapon called the Massive Ordnance Air Blast Bomb; nicknamed the "Mother Of All Bombs" (MOAB). The intended target was ISIL militants hiding inside tunnels, most of whom came "from Bangladesh, Pakistan, Tajikistan, Russia, India and other countries." Mohammad Radmanish, spokesman for the Afghan Ministry of Defense stated: "Most militants killed in the attack were from Pakistan, India, Philippines, and Bangladesh." It was the first time the MOAB had been used in combat.

Healthcare

The percentage of households with clean drinking water fell from 43% in 2005 to 8% in 2011. 
The percentage of births attended to by a skilled birth attendant increased from 22% in 2005 to 60% in 2011.

Education

Nangarhar University is located in the provincial capital, Jalalabad. It is government-funded and provides higher education to nearly 6,000 students from the region.

A number of schools operate in the province, providing basic education to both boys and girls. The overall literacy rate (6+ years of age) increased from 29% in 2005 to 31% in 2011. 
The overall net enrollment rate (6–13 years of age) increased from 39% in 2005 to 51% in 2011.

Economy

The Jalalabad plain is one of the principal agricultural areas of Afghanistan. The strong agricultural base, coupled with the crucial trade route connecting Kabul with Peshawar, makes Nangarhar one of the more economically diverse and functional provinces of Afghanistan. Torkham is one of the major border crossings between Afghanistan and Pakistan. It is the busiest port of entry between the two countries, serving as a major economical hub for the province.

Nangarhar is famous in Afghanistan for producing lemons, oranges, olives, peanuts and dates. Beside that many other fruits and vegetables are also grown. It was once a major center of opium poppy production in the country.

Transportation

The Jalalabad Airport is located next to the city of Jalalabad. It serves the populations of Nangarhar, Kunar, Nuristan, and other nearby provinces.

The Kabul–Jalalabad Road runs throughout the province, linking Kabul with Jalalabad and extending east through Khyber Pass to Peshawar. It is one of the busiest major roads in Afghanistan.

Geography

Demographics

As of 2021, the population of the province is around 1,735,531. Over 90% of the population is Pashtun and the remaining is made up of Pashais, Tajiks, Arabs, and other ethnic groups. The 18th edition Ethnologue states on p. 48 that Nangarhar is the center of the (smaller) Northern Pashto language in Afghanistan. Only 1 in 5 Afghan Pashtuns use the Northern variety.

Districts
Nangarhar is divided into 23 districts. They are as follows:

Sports

The province is represented in domestic cricket competitions by the Nangarhar province cricket team. Jalalabad is considered the capital of Afghan cricket with many of the national players coming from the surrounding areas. National team members Hamid Hasan and Rashid Khan were born in the province.

De Spinghar Bazan is  a regional team in the Roshan Afghan Premier League based in Jalalabad. Jalalabad Regional Football Tournament were four local team plays like Malang Jan, Shaheed Qasim, Afghan Refugees and Laghman for to find raw talent in Afghan Premier League. Wrestling in Jalalabad was modernized by Davud Sulaymankhil, a Pashtun orator and athlete. Now, several wrestling teams (most notably the Suleim Wrestling Team founded by Davud Sulaymanhil) represent the province in national events.

Stadiums
 Ghazi Amanullah International Cricket Stadium is the first international standard cricket stadium in Afghanistan. It is located in the Ghazi Amanullah Town about 15 kilometres south-east of Jalalabad.
 Sirajul Emarah Football Stadium in Jalalabad

Notable people 

 Muqadasa Ahmadzai - social and political activist
 Rashid Khan - Afghan Cricketer and winner of ICC Mens T20 Cricketer of Decade
 Hamid Hassan - Afghan Cricketer
 Qais Ahmad - Afghan Cricketer
 Aftab Alam - Afghan Cricketer
 Samiullah Shinwari - Afghan Cricketer
 Mohammad Shahzad - Afghan Cricketer

See also
 Eastern Province, Afghanistan
 Provinces of Afghanistan

References

External links

 , Feb 7, 2012, TOLO/USAIDAfghanistan.
 , Feb 22, 2012, TOLO/USAIDAfghanistan (in Pashto).
 Nangarhar Province by the Naval Postgraduate School
 Nangarhar Province by the Institute for the Study of War
 Nangahar Aerial Pictures

 
Provinces of Afghanistan
Provinces of the Islamic Republic of Afghanistan